A fiber-optic current sensor (FOCS) is a current sensor for measuring direct current.  By using a single-ended optical fiber around the current conductor that utilizes the magneto-optic effect (Faraday effect), FOCS measures uni- or bidirectional DC currents of up to 600 kA within ±0.1% of the measured value.

Because it does not need a magnetic yoke, an FOCS is smaller and lighter than Hall effect current sensors, and suffers no reduction in accuracy due to saturation effects.  Because magnetic field sensing is distributed around circumference, it is unaffected by stray magnetic fields, and there is no need for magnetic centering.  It also does not need recalibration after installation or during its service life.  Because the optical fiber is inherently insulating, electrical isolation is easier to maintain.

The optical phase detection circuit, light source and digital signal processor are contained within the sensor electronics; this technology has been proven in highly demanding applications such as navigation systems in the air, on land and at sea.

Applications

In 2013, ABB launched a 420 kV Disconnecting Circuit Breaker (DCB) with integrated FOCS. Since one FOCS replaces many conventional current transformers, engineering and design of the substation is simplified. By reducing the material needed, including insulation, a 420 kV DCB with integrated FOCS can reduce a substation's footprint by over 50% compared to the conventional solution of live tank breakers with disconnectors and current transformers.

References

Sensors
Electrical components
Electric power distribution
Electric power systems components

de:FOCS